Turkish basketball clubs in European and worldwide competitions is the performance record of men's professional basketball clubs from Turkey's top-tier level league, the Basketbol Süper Ligi (BSL), in international competitions.

The finals

European-wide competitions

World-wide competitions

Turkish clubs in EuroLeague (1st tier)

Season to season

Turkish clubs in FIBA Saporta Cup (2nd tier)

Season to season

Turkish clubs in FIBA Korać Cup (3rd tier)

Season to season

See also
European basketball clubs in European and worldwide competitions from:
 Croatia
 Czechoslovakia
 France
 Greece
 Israel
 Italy
 Russia
 Spain
 USSR
 Yugoslavia

References

Basketball in Turkey